The Estadio Jorge Basadre, previously known as the Estadio Modelo, is a multi-purpose stadium in Tacna, Peru named after historian Jorge Basadre. It is currently used as a football stadium in the Primera Division Peruana by Coronel Bolognesi. The stadium holds 19,850 people and has 277 individual seats in the western stand, 69 which are for the VIP area. The rest of the stadium has standing terraces. The name was changed when it was renovated for the Copa America 2004. It will be used again for the 2019 FIFA U-17 World Cup.

References

External links
World Stadiums 

Football venues in Peru
Estadio Jorge Basadre
Copa América stadiums
Multi-purpose stadiums in Peru
Sports venues completed in 2000
Estadio Jorge Basadre
2000 establishments in Peru